Active Interest Media (AIM) is a publisher specializing in "niche enthusiast magazines" (i.e. magazines targeted at hobbyists).

History
The company was formed in 2003 by private-equity investment firm Wind Point Partners  by the acquisition of Sabot Publishing, a "special interest" publisher based in Richmond, VA which had been established in 1999 by James Causey and Colonnade Capital. In July 2017, the company announced that it had acquired the United States Team Roping Championships and the TRIAD Classification Agency. In 2020, AIM sold these properties in conjunction with the sale of many of its largest divisions to Pocket Outdoor Media.

Overview
Active Interest Media publications are organized in two "groups", the Home Buyer Group (home improvement, architecture, interior design etc.); and the Marine Group (sailing, yachts, etc.).

On 7 November 2012, PixelMags Inc. announced that they had  reached an agreement with Active Interest Media to distribute magazine content digitally.

In March 2017, Active Interest Media sold its Yachting Promotions Inc. division to Informa for $133 million. The sale included the Fort Lauderdale International Boat Show, Yachts Miami Beach, the Palm Beach International Boat Show, the St. Petersburg Power and Sailboat Show, and the Suncoast Boat Show.

On 30 April 2013, Active Interest Media purchased Warren Miller Entertainment and Nastar. In 2015, Active Interest Media purchased August Home Publishing. Chairman and Chief Executive Officer is Efrem Zimbalist III (the son of Efrem Zimbalist, Jr.), formerly of Times Mirror Magazines, a subsidiary of Times Mirror.

In 2019, Active Interest Media acquired the “collectibles” magazines from F+W Media, which includes Coins, Numismatic News, Writer’s Digest, Popular Woodworking, and Horticulture.

In 2020, Active Interest Media sold off "several of its largest publications" to Pocket Outdoor Media of Boulder, Colorado (which was renamed to Outside Inc. the following year).

In 2021, Wind Point sold AIM to B&W Communications, a company founded by CEO Andy Clurman. In 2021, Active Interest Media sold its Equine Network properties to Growth Catalyst Partners.

References

External links

Magazine publishing companies of the United States
Publishing companies established in 2003
Mass media in Boulder, Colorado